Pievebovigliana is a frazione of Valfornace in the Province of Macerata in the Italian region Marche, located about  southwest of Ancona and about  southwest of Macerata. It was a separate comune until January 1, 2017, when it was merged with Fiordimonte, which created the Valfornace comune. It is located in  the Monti Sibillini National Park.

People
Opera singer Enzo Sordello was born in Pievebovigliana in 1927.

References

 

Former municipalities of the Marche